The 1990 Arizona State Sun Devils football team was an American football team that represented Arizona State University in the Pacific-10 Conference (Pac-10) during the 1990 NCAA Division I-A football season. In their third season under head coach Larry Marmie, the Sun Devils compiled a 4–7 record (2–5 against Pac-10 opponents), finished in eighth place in the Pac-10, and were outscored by their opponents by a combined total of 294 to 272.

The team's statistical leaders included Paul Justin with 1,876 passing yards, Leonard Russell with 810 rushing yards, and Eric Guliford with 837 receiving yards.

Schedule

Roster

Season summary

Washington

Oregon State

ASU assistant Frank Falks collapsed after the game and was taken to the hospital but later released.

vs. Houston

The Sun Devils lost a high-scoring matchup in Tokyo — a game where the two teams combined for 1,445 yards of total offense (1,190 yards passing). Houston's David Klingler set the Division I-A single-game passing record with 716 yards.

References

Arizona State
Arizona State Sun Devils football seasons
Arizona State Sun Devils football